Wall to Wall Media, part of Warner Bros. Television Studios UK (formerly Shed Media Group), is an independent television production company that produces event specials and drama, factual entertainment, science and history programmes for broadcast by networks in both the United Kingdom and United States. Its productions include Who Do You Think You Are?, New Tricks, Child Genius, and Long Lost Family.

In January 2009, Wall to Wall's first feature film Man on Wire won a BAFTA award for Outstanding British Film and followed this success with an Academy Award for Best Documentary Feature. Previously, the company had won a Peabody Award in 2000 for The 1900 House.

Wall to Wall joined the Shed Media Group in November 2007. 

In July 2017, Wall to Wall opened a regional production base in Bristol called Wall to Wall West headed by Emily Shields. Productions from Wall to Wall West include variations of the BBC Two lifestyle documentary series Back in Time for... and The World's Most Extraordinary Homes.

Wall to Wall was one of the first production companies to win a factual commission from Apple TV+ with its series Becoming You, which premiered on 13 November, 2020.

The company's name derives from negative references made in the mid-1980s, by then BBC Director-General Alasdair Milne and in the title of a book by Financial Times journalist Chris Dunkley, to "wall-to-wall Dallas" as a possible after-effect of the coming deregulation of UK broadcasting.  Future BBC2 controller Jane Root, among the company's founders, considered this a negative, puritanical and conservative view of the medium's possibilities (ref. NME, 17 May 1986) and the name "Wall to Wall Television" was adopted as a conscious celebration of the medium, which its founders considered the "establishment" of the time to be frightened of.

Programming

Current productions
Long Lost Family: six series for ITV- total 43 episodes with more in production.
Back in Time For...: five series for BBC Two – total 22 episodes, with more in production.
Child Genius: four series plus a documentary, Celebrity Special and a "Five Years On" special for Channel 4 – total 18 episodes with more in production. 
Who Do You Think You Are?: twelve series plus adoption special for BBC One – total 110 episodes, with more in production.
500 Questions: First series for ITV.

Filmography

References

External links

Warner Bros.
Television production companies of the United Kingdom

ro:Wall to Wall